Donal Skehan (born 3 June 1986) is an Irish television personality, presenter (specialising in food programmes), food writer, cook, photographer and former singer. He is known for his television series, cookbooks, popular YouTube channel and use of toast.

Skehan was also a member of the boy band Streetwize. As vocalist with Industry he had two No. 1 singles with them on the Irish Singles Chart in 2009.

Early life
His parents, Dermot and Liz, are in the food industry; running their own food distribution company. Having grown up in Howth, Skehan attended Sutton Park School and went on to study media at Dublin Business School.

Television and cooking career

Television personality
Skehan worked as an announcer on the Irish entertainment specialty channel Bubble Hits, broadcasting music and entertainment news and celebrity gossip segments.

Food author and presenter
An avid food enthusiast, Skehan started a blog in 2007 called Good Mood Food that evolved into a cookbook.
After many appearances on television, and giving of live demonstrations at social events and shows, he was featured in his own weekly food programme, Kitchen Hero, on RTÉ One that was launched on 16 May 2011. In 2011, he published a cookbook based on the television series, Home Kitchen Hero – Bringing Cooking Back Home. A second series and a Christmas special were aired in 2012. UKTV network Good Food began airing the show in April 2012. The show is now in its sixth year of production.

Skehan became a co-presenter and judge on Junior MasterChef on the BBC in 2012, appearing alongside John Torode. In 2013, after appearing on Jamie Oliver's YouTube channel, Foodtube, Skehan launched his own dedicated YouTube channel which has since grown to over 1M subscribers.

Skehan presented a new series for Food Network UK, Follow Donal, which saw him explore Vietnam in a four-part series and then went on to visit ten European cities in the second installment of the series which aired in the autumn of 2015. Skehan is also appearing in the Swedish food programme Mitt kök on TV4 where he speaks Swedish. Skehan is currently one of a number of rotating guest presenters for Saturday Kitchen on BBC One and has hosted six editions of the show to date. In 2021, his book Everyday Cook won Cookbook of the Year at the Irish Book Awards.

Music career

2006: Streetwize
Skehan was interested very early in music. In 2006, he became part of the global/international boy band project Streetwize (alongside Irish Lee Mulhern (later known as Lee Matthews), English Lee Hutton and Swedish Jonathan Fagerlund). The original members made a tour in Ireland, UK, Sweden, and appeared on the US television station CN8, a cable television station where they performed "Room in Your Heart" in a morning show hosted by Greg Coy. Skehan and Jonathan Fagerlund were disenchanted with the progress of the band and left early to be replaced by Venezuelan Antonio Jones and American Kyle Carpenter. Streetwize eventually folded without any hits.

2008: Irish Eurosong preliminaries for Eurovision Song Contest

On 23 February 2008, Skehan took part in Eurosong 2008 in a bid to represent Ireland in the 2008 Eurovision Song Contest with the song "Double Cross My Heart". It was a pop song composed by Joel Humlen, Oscar Gorres and Charlie Mason, and performed by Skehan with two male and two female back-up dancers, as well as a male back-up singer. Skehan was one of the Final 6, alongside Dustin the Turkey, Maja, Leona Daly, Liam Geddes and Marc Roberts; with Dustin the Turkey winning with the song "Irelande Douze Pointe".

2009–2010: Industry 

In 2009, Skehan joined the Irish band Industry alongside the English Lee Hutton (his former bandmate in Streetwize) and Irish girl members Michele McGrath and Morgan Deane. Industry had success in the Irish charts including two chart-topping singles "My Baby's Waiting" in June 2009 and "Burn" in August of the same year on the Irish Singles Chart. In 2009, they were also a supporting act for The Pussycat Dolls at Fitzgerald Stadium. Later Industry single releases like "In Your Arms", "My Mistake", "Drown in the Music" and "Kill the DJ" did not chart. The band broke up in 2010.

Personal life
In June 2015, Skehan married Sofie Larsson in Dublin City Hall followed by a reception in Lisnavagh House in County Carlow and had their honeymoon in Ravello on Italy's Amalfi Coast. In April 2016, Skehan and his wife moved to Los Angeles.

In June 2017, the couple announced that they were expecting their first child. In December 2017, their son was born in Los Angeles. In June 2019, the couple announced they are expecting a second child. On 28 November 2019 their second son was born.

Filmography

Television

Web

Discography

Singles
Solo
"Double Cross My Heart" (2008)

As part of Industry
"My Baby's Waiting" (2010) (No. 1 on the Irish Singles Chart)
"Burn" (2009) (No. 1 on the Irish Singles Chart)
"In Your Arms" (2009)
"My Mistake" (2009)
"Drown in the Music" (2010)
"Kill the DJ" (2010)

Bibliography
2009: Good Mood Food: Simple, Healthy Homecooking!
2011: Kitchen Hero: Bringing Cooking Back Home
2012: Kitchen Hero: Great Food For Less
2013: Home Cooked
2013: Feast: A Dinner Journal 
2013: Easy Recipes for Summer Cooking 
2014: The Pleasures of the Table: Rediscovering Theodora FitzGibbon
2015: Fresh
2016: Eat. Live. Go – Fresh Food Fast
2018: Donal's Meal in Minutes: 90 Suppers from Scratch, 15 Minutes Prep
2019: Super Food in Minutes: Easy Recipes, Fast Food, All Healthy
2021: Everyday Cook

References

External links

RTÉ One web page on Kitchen Hero

1986 births
Living people
Television personalities from Dublin (city)
RTÉ television presenters
Irish television chefs
Irish YouTubers
21st-century Irish male  singers
Alumni of Dublin Business School
People from Howth